William Mackenzie McLeod (July 4, 1854 – June 13, 1932) was a Canadian physician and politician.

Born in Sydney, Nova Scotia, McLeod was educated at Sydney Academy and Dalhousie University. He took his medical course in New York City at Bellevue Hospital Medical College graduating in 1875. In 1889 and 1890 he also took special courses in the diseases of the eye, ear, nose and throat at New York Post-Graduate Medical School and Hospital. From 1875 until 1879, he practiced his profession in Sydney, when he entered the political field and was elected to the House of Commons of Canada succeeding his brother, Hugh McLeod, to represent the riding of Cape Breton. A Liberal-Conservative, he was defeated in 1882. In 1883, he was appointed Medical Superintendent of Quarantine at Sydney. In 1886, he organized the Sydney Battery of Field Artillery (Canadian Militia), of which he was the Major in command.

He was president of the Cape Breton Medical Society, and a member of the Nova Scotia Medical Society. In religion he was a Presbyterian, the son of Rev. Hugh McLeod (Canadian minister), DD, who came from Tain, Scotland in 1849 and was a Free Church leader in Mira Ferry, Cape Breton; in 1877 was elected as the third Moderator of the Presbyterian Church in Canada. 
His second wife, née Jessie McIntosh (1867–1935) was a key leader in the Women's Missionary Society, Eastern Division, and opposed the formation of the United Church of Canada.

External links
 

This article incorporates text from The Canadian album: men of Canada, Vol. 3, a publication now in the public domain.

1854 births
1932 deaths
Canadian Presbyterians
Conservative Party of Canada (1867–1942) MPs
Dalhousie University alumni
Members of the House of Commons of Canada from Nova Scotia